The 1973 Miami Redskins football team was an American football team that represented Miami University during the 1973 NCAA Division I football season. In their fifth and final season under head coach Bill Mallory, the Redskins won the Mid-American Conference (MAC) championship, compiled an 11–0 record (5–0 in MAC), outscored its opponents 223 to 76, and defeated Florida 16–7 in the Tangerine Bowl.

The team's statistical leaders included quarterback Steve Sanna with 927 passing yards, Bob Hitchens with 591 rushing yards, and John Wiggins with 414 receiving yards.

In January 1974, Mallory left for the University of Colorado of the Big Eight Conference.

Schedule

References

Miami
Miami RedHawks football seasons
Mid-American Conference football champion seasons
Citrus Bowl champion seasons
College football undefeated seasons
Miami Redskins football